Gorytvesica cidnozodion is a species of moth of the family Tortricidae. It is endemic to Ecuador (Morona-Santiago Province).

The ground colour of the forewings is dark brown. There are two snow white lines running towards the dorsum. The hindwings are paler than forewingthe forewings.

Etymology
The species name refers to size and colouration of the species and is derived from Latin cidno (meaning homely) and Greek zodion (meaning small animal).

References

External links

Moths described in 2006
Endemic fauna of Ecuador
Euliini
Moths of South America
Taxa named by Józef Razowski